The internet is an important contributor to Ireland's economy and education. The telecommunications infrastructure in Ireland provides Internet access to businesses and home users in various forms, including fibre, cable, DSL, wireless, Fixed Wireless and mobile. In 2019, 91% of households have access to the Internet in Ireland at home, with 88% of individuals reporting that they had used the internet in the three months prior to interview.

As of 2018, 82% of adults aged 16 to 44 years in Ireland were recent internet users; in aggregate, the sixteenth-highest in Europe.

The Internet country code top-level domain (ccTLD) for Ireland is .ie.

Overview

 Internet users: 4.0 million, 82.2% of the population, 87th in the world (2016); 3.0 million, 67th in the world (2009)
 Internet hosts: 1.4 million, 40th in the world (2012)
 Internet censorship: Little or none (2011)
 Top-level domain name: .ie

Internet Providers Of Ireland 
There are many internet providers in Ireland, offering internet connectivity across a range of connection types.

Market Statistics 
As of Q4 2020, there are 1.8 million broadband subscriptions in Ireland (including mobile broadband but not including mobile phone broadband). Eir had 30% of market share, followed by Virgin Media at 25%, Vodafone at 19%, and Sky at 14%. There are 248,528 subscriptions to fiber to the premises, of which Vodafone has 39% and Eir has 36%.

As of Q4 2020, there are 5.23 million mobile subscriptions in Ireland (not including mobile broadband). 2.42 million of these are prepay subscriptions, while 2.81 million are post paid. 4.53 million of these internet connections are 4G. Mobile providers such as Vodafone, Eir and Three has launched 5G, subscriber figures for 5G is not yet available.

As of Q4 2020, Vodafone has 35.3% market share, followed by Three at 30.5%, Eir at 21.7%, Tesco at 8.3%, Virgin Mobile at 2.3%. Other operators make up 1.9%.

Access cost and quality 

In 2017, a study carried out by BDRC Continental and Cable.co.uk rated Ireland as the third most expensive country in the EU for broadband.

According to Deutsche Bank Research "Mapping the World's Prices 2019" report, Internet access in Dublin is the second most expensive in the world, after Dubai in UAE.

Speed tests run by SpeedTest.net in June 2020 rank mobile Internet access in Ireland at the 78th place in the world, below Angola, and at the 39th place for broadband, below Malaysia and above Kuwait.

History 
Founded in 1996, the Internet Neutral Exchange (INEX) is an industry-owned association that provides IP peering and traffic exchange for its members in Ireland. The INEX switching centres are located in four secure data centres in Dublin: TeleCity Group in Kilcarbery Park, Dublin 22 & TeleCity Group in Citywest Business Campus, Dublin 24 and Interxion DUB1, and Interxion DUB2 in Park West. The switches are connected by dedicated resilient fibre links. In March 2013 it listed 57 full and 18 associate members.

Established in 1998, the Internet Service Providers Association of Ireland (ISPAI) listed 24 Internet access and hosting providers as members in 2012.

Eir, the largest telephone company in Ireland, began rolling out broadband Internet access in 2002. Broadband Internet access is available via DSL, cable, wireless, and satellite. By the end of 2011 Eircom announced that 75% of its working lines would be connected to Next Generation Broadband (NGB) enabled exchanges.

In August 2012, Pat Rabbitte, the Minister for Communications, Energy and Natural Resources, outlined a national broadband plan with goals of:
 70-100 Mbit/s broadband service available to at least 50 per cent of the population,
 at least 40 Mbit/s available to at least a further 20 per cent, and
 a minimum of 30 Mbit/s available to everyone, no matter how rural or remote.

Censorship

Internet censorship in Ireland is a controversial issue with the introduction of a graduated response policy in 2008 followed by an effort to block certain file sharing sites starting in February 2009. Grassroots campaigns including "Blackout Ireland" and "Boycott Eircom" have been established to protest the censorship.

Beyond these issues there are no government restrictions on access to the Internet or credible reports that the government monitors e-mail or Internet chat rooms. Individuals and groups could engage in the expression of views via the Internet, including by e-mail. Irish law provides for freedom of speech including for members of the press, and the government generally respects these rights in practice. An independent press, an effective judiciary, and a functioning democratic political system act jointly to ensure freedom of speech and of the press.

See also
 Broadband in Northern Ireland
 IE Domain Registry
 Internet Neutral Exchange, an Internet traffic exchange point located in Ireland
 Internet Service Providers Association of Ireland
 Irish Internet Hotline, illegal Internet content reporting service
 Media of the Republic of Ireland
 Pirate Party (Ireland)
 Telecommunications in Ireland

References

External links
 Commission for Communications Regulation
 Hotline.ie, service for reporting illegal Internet content 
 ISP Association of Ireland (ISPAI)
 Lightnet Broadband

 
Internet in Ireland